74 (seventy-four) is the natural number following 73 and preceding 75.

In mathematics
74 is:

 the twenty-first distinct semiprime and the eleventh of the form 2×q.
 a palindromic number in bases 6 (2026) and 36 (2236).
 a nontotient.
 the number of collections of subsets of {1, 2, 3} that are closed under union and intersection.
 φ(74) = φ(σ(74)).

There are 74 different non-Hamiltonian polyhedra with a minimum number of vertices.

In science
The atomic number of tungsten

In astronomy

 Messier object M74, a magnitude 10.5 spiral galaxy in the constellation Pisces.
 The New General Catalogue object NGC 74, a galaxy in the constellation Andromeda.

In music
 Seventy-four, one of the Number Pieces by John Cage
 "Seventy-Four", a song by the American band Bright from the album The Albatross Guest House

In bus routes
In  Chicago, "74" is the Fullerton bus which runs from Lincoln Park to Belmont Cragin.

London Buses route 74 is a Transport for London contracted bus route in London, England. Running between Baker Street station and Putney, it is operated by London General.

In other fields

Seventy-four is also:
The year AD 74, 74 BC, or 1974
Designates the 7400 series of Integrated Chips. 74xx xx=00-4538
A seventy-four was a third-rate warship with 74 guns.
The registry of the U.S. Navy's nuclear aircraft carrier USS John C. Stennis (CVN-74), named after U.S. Senator John C. Stennis
A hurricane or typhoon is a system with sustained winds of at least 74 mph (64 knots). 
The number of the French department Haute-Savoie
In the Bible it is the number of people that were in the presence of God on Mount Sinai and saw God without dying “Exodus 24:9-11”

References 

Integers